Albany railway station is a railway station in Albany, Western Australia.

History and overview 
It was constructed in 1888 by the Great Southern Land Company.

It was a passenger railway station on the Western Australian Government Railways services, from 1961 until the end of the running of the Albany Progress in 1978.

It is often included in pictures of Stirling Terrace and of the jetties and facilities of the Port of Albany.

Following reduction in rail services, various proposals were investigated, and the railway station precinct was assessed for heritage status.

The station is both a heritage listed structure, and it was a tourist information centre and Transwa bus terminal.

See also
Old Bunbury railway station

Notes

Disused railway stations in Western Australia
State Register of Heritage Places in the City of Albany
Heritage places in Albany, Western Australia